The Latin Grammy Award for Best Classical Contemporary Composition is given every year since the 9th Latin Grammy Awards ceremony, which took place at the Toyota Center in Houston, Texas.

The description of the category at the 2020 Latin Grammy Awards states that it is "for new vocal and instrumental recordings of original works or compositions that have been composed within the last twenty-five (25) years (a work/composition IS NOT eligible if it was composed before 1995), and that were released for the first time during the Eligibility Period." The award goes to the composer(s).

Argentine composer Claudia Montero holds the record of most wins in this category followed by Argentine composer Carlos Franzetti with two victories.

Winners and nominees

2000s

2010s

2020s

References

External links
Official site of the Latin Grammy Awards

Contemporary Composition
Latin Grammy Awards for classical music